is the second mini studio album by the rock band Jinn. It was released on July 14, 2010.

Track listing
 [3:52]
 [3:18]
 [3:50]
 [5:02]
 [4:17]
"Optimist" [3:31]

References

Jinn (band) albums
2010 albums